Mazgah (also Romanized as Māzgāh) is a village in Shuil Rural District, Rahimabad District, Rudsar County, Gilan Province, Iran. At the 2006 census, its population was 38, in 10 families.

References 

Populated places in Rudsar County